The Curtiss L was an  water-cooled V-8 aero-engine.

References

Curtiss aircraft engines